Kabita Kunwar is a Nepali cricketer and right arm-medium bowler for the Nepal women's national cricket team.

International career 
Kajal was in the playing 11 of the Nepal women first twenty 20 International debut match against China women's national cricket team. She also represented Nepal in the 2019 ICC Women's Qualifier Asia in Bangkok, Thailand. This is a tournament which is an Asia region qualifier for the 2019 ICC Women's World Twenty20 Qualifier as well as the 2020 Women's Cricket World Cup Qualifier tournaments, with the top team progressing to both of them.

In October 2021, she was named in Nepal's side for the 2021 ICC Women's T20 World Cup Asia Qualifier tournament in the United Arab Emirates.

References

Living people
Nepalese women cricketers
2003 births
Nepal women Twenty20 International cricketers
South Asian Games bronze medalists for Nepal
South Asian Games medalists in cricket
Khas people